Mateus Fernandes may refer to:

Mateus Fernandes (architect) (died 1515), Portuguese architect
Mateus Fernandes (fighter) (1997–2019), Brazilian amateur fighter
Mateus Fernandes (footballer) (born 2004), Portuguese football midfielder for Sporting

See also
Matheus Fernandes (born 1998), Brazilian football midfielder for Athletico Paranaense